Sex Positive is a 2008 documentary film about Richard Berkowitz directed by Daryl Wein. The film explores Berkowitz's life, presenting him as a revolutionary gay activist whose incomparable contribution to the invention of safe sex has never been aptly credited.

The documentary had footages from Berkowitz, as well as Don Adler, Dotty Berkowitz (his mother), Susan Brown, Dr. Demetre Daskalakis, Richard Dworkin (actor and artist), William A. Haseltine, Larry Kramer, Ardele Lister, Michael Lucas, Francisco Roque (director of Gay Men's Health Crisis), Gabriel Rotello, Joseph Sonnabend, Dr. Bill Stackhouse GMHC Secretary, Krishna Stone (former GMHC director of community relations), Sean Strub and Edmund White.

In 2008, the film won the Grand Jury Award at the Los Angeles Outfest for "Best Documentary Feature".

References

External links

2008 films
American documentary films
2008 documentary films
Documentary films about HIV/AIDS
American LGBT-related films
2008 LGBT-related films
2000s English-language films
HIV/AIDS in American films
2000s American films
English-language documentary films